"Baby, I'm Missing You" is a song written by Steve Seskin and Nancy Montgomery, and recorded by American country music group Highway 101.  It was released in January 1992 as the third single from the 1991 album Bing Bang Boom.  The song reached #22 on the Billboard Hot Country Singles & Tracks chart.

Chart performance

References

1991 songs
1992 singles
Highway 101 songs
Songs written by Steve Seskin
Song recordings produced by Paul Worley
Warner Records singles